The 2018 North Dakota State Bison football team represents North Dakota State University in the 2018 NCAA Division I FCS football season. They were led by fifth-year head coach Chris Klieman, who also coached his final season with the Bison before heading off to take over for the retiring Bill Snyder at Kansas State. The team played their 26th season in the Fargodome in Fargo, North Dakota as members of the Missouri Valley Football Conference. They entered the season as defending National Champions and had won six of the last seven FCS titles. In 2018, the Bison finished the regular season 11–0, the first undefeated Bison season since the 2013 campaign, and won their eighth consecutive MVFC title. They received an automatic qualifying bid to the FCS playoff tournament and were seeded as the No. 1 team.  The Bison then went 4–0 in the FCS playoffs to finish 15–0 and FCS champions.

Previous season
The Bison finished the 2017 season 14–1, 7–1 in MVFC play to win the MVFC championship for the seventh consecutive year. As a result, the Bison received the conference's automatic bid to the FCS Playoffs as the No. 2 seed. In the playoffs, they defeated San Diego, Wofford, and Sam Houston State to advance to the National Championship game. There they defeated James Madison  to win the school's sixth National Championship in seven years.

Preseason

Award watch lists

Preseason MVFC poll
The MVFC released their preseason poll on July 29, 2018, with the Bison predicted unanimously to win the MVFC championship.

Preseason All-MVFC Teams
The Bison placed eleven players on the preseason all-MVFC teams.

Offense

1st team

Bruce Anderson – RB

Brock Robbins – FB

Zack Johnson – OL

Tanner Volson – OL

2nd team

Easton Stick – QB

Darrius Shepherd – WR

Defense

1st team

Greg Menard – DL

Aaron Steidl – DL

Jabril Cox – LB

Robbie Grimsley – DB

2nd team

Derrek Tuszka – DL

Schedule

 Source: Schedule

Game summaries
Polls are based on the FCS STATS Poll

Cal Poly

North Alabama

Delaware

South Dakota State

at Northern Iowa

at Western Illinois

Illinois State

at South Dakota

Youngstown State

at Missouri State

Southern Illinois

FCS Playoffs

Montana State–Second Round

Colgate–Quarterfinals

South Dakota State–Semifinals

Eastern Washington–Championship

Ranking movements

Players drafted into the NFL

References

North Dakota State
North Dakota State Bison football seasons
NCAA Division I Football Champions
Missouri Valley Football Conference champion seasons
College football undefeated seasons
North Dakota State
North Dakota State Bison football